Lickburg is an unincorporated community located in Magoffin County, Kentucky, United States.

References

Unincorporated communities in Magoffin County, Kentucky
Unincorporated communities in Kentucky